Trismelasmos magellani is a moth in the family Cossidae. It was described by Yakovlev in 2006. It is found in New Guinea.

The length of the forewings is about 22 mm. The forewings are brown. The hindwings are brown with brown patches along the veins and a reticulate pattern between them.

Etymology
The species is named in honour of Ferdinand Magellan.

References

Natural History Museum Lepidoptera generic names catalog

Zeuzerinae
Moths described in 2006